Kevin Anderson was the defending champion, but withdrew before the tournament began because of a right elbow injury.

Reilly Opelka won his first ATP Tour title, defeating Brayden Schnur in the final, 6–1, 6–7(7–9), 7–6(9–7).

Seeds
The top four seeds received a bye into the second round.

Draw

Finals

Top half

Bottom half

Qualifying

Seeds

Qualifiers

Lucky loser
  Alexei Popyrin

Qualifying draw

First qualifier

Second qualifier

Third qualifier

Fourth qualifier

References

 Main draw
 Qualifying draw

2019 ATP Tour
2019 Singles